One for Buck is an album by trumpeter Buck Clayton which was recorded in 1961 and released on the British Columbia label.

Track listing
All compositions by Buck Clayton except where noted.
 "Night Ferry" – 6:09
 "I Can't Give You Anything But Love" (Jimmy McHugh, Dorothy Fields) – 7:42
 "One For Buck"  (Humphrey Lyttleton) – 5:44
 "Mr. Melody Maker" – 6:50
 "Blue Mist" (Lyttleton) – 7:35
 "Prince Eagle Head" (Kenny Graham) – 5:50

Personnel
Buck Clayton – trumpet
Dicky Wells – trombone
Earle Warren – alto saxophone, clarinet
Buddy Tate – tenor saxophone
Sir Charles Thompson – piano
Gene Ramey – bass
Oliver Jackson – drums

References

1961 albums
Buck Clayton albums
Columbia Records albums
Jazz albums by American artists